APCN or Asia-Pacific Cable Network is a submarine telecommunications cable system linking nine Asian countries.

It has landing points in:
Petchaburi, Thailand
Mersing, Malaysia
Changi, Singapore
Ancol, Indonesia
Lantau, Hong Kong
Batangas, Philippines
Toucheng, Taiwan
Busan, Korea
Miyazaki, Japan

It has a transmission capacity of 5 Gbit/s, and a total cable length of approximately 12,000 km. It started operations in 1997.

See also
APCN 2
List of international submarine communications cables
Cable landing point

Sources

 
 
 

Submarine communications cables in the Pacific Ocean
1997 establishments in Asia
Submarine communications cables in the Indian Ocean